Charles-Gaspard-Guillaume de Vintimille du Luc (1655–1746) was a French Catholic bishop. He was Bishop of Marseille from 1692 to 1708 and Archbishop of Aix from 1708 to 1729; from 1729 to 1746 he was the Archbishop of Paris.

Biography

Charles-Gaspard-Guillaume de Vintimille du Luc was born in Le Luc on 15 November 1655, the son of François de Vintimille, Seigneur du Luc, and Anne de Forbin.

As a youngest son, Charles-Gaspard was groomed for a life in the church. In 1692, he became Bishop of Marseilles. He served there until 1708, when he became Archbishop of Aix. During this time, Aix-en-Provence, and Provence generally, were ravaged by plague.

On 10 May 1729 he was appointed Archbishop of Paris, becoming Duke of Saint-Cloud as well as a result.

He died in Paris on 13 March 1746.

References
 This page is based on this page on French Wikipedia.

External links
 

1655 births
1746 deaths
Archbishops of Paris
18th-century peers of France
Dukes of Saint-Cloud